The 1985 Arkansas State Indians football team represented Arkansas State University as a member of the Southland Conference during the 1985 NCAA Division I-AA football season. Led by seventh-year head coach Larry Lacewell, the Indians compiled an overall record of 9–4 with a mark of 5–1 in conference play, winning the Southland title. Arkansas State advanced to the NCAA Division I-AA Football Championship playoffs, where they defeated Grambling State in the first round and lost to Nevada in the quarterfinals.

Schedule

References

Arkansas State
Arkansas State Red Wolves football seasons
Southland Conference football champion seasons
Arkansas State Indians football